Mysomakedones, also Mysomacedonians or Myso-Macedonians, was a Hellenistic city in Anatolia. It was located in Mysia according to Ptolemy, but in the conventus (district) of Ephesus, Ionia, according to Pliny. Strabo mentions the presence of Macedonians and Mysians in Tmolus mountain, Lydia and the Mesogis region of Ephesus.

The colony is believed to have been established as a military settlement by the Seleucids and/or Attalids, with the intention to protect the coastal district from the Galatians. Two coins of the city dated to the 1st century have also been found, but the precise location of the settlement has not yet been established.

References
The Hellenistic settlements in Europe, the islands, and Asia Minor By Getzel M. Cohen Page 221   .   (1995)

Macedonian colonies
Mysia
Hellenistic colonies in Anatolia